H. Rutherford Turnbull III -- Rud --is an American author, educator and leader in the field of disability policy and law.  He is Ross and Marianna Beach Distinguished Professor Emeritus of special education and law at University of Kansas. He was the principal draftsman or staff person for the NC Senate and House in revising that state's disability laws (special education, limited guardianship, civil commitment, rights of institutionalized persons, eligibility to vote) while being professor of public law and government, University of North Carolina at Chapel Hill  (1969-80). During his professorship at The University of Kansas (1980-2015), he was principal staff for the federal Assistive Technology Act and the family support provisions of the Rehab Act; principal draftsman of the "procedural safeguards" regulations under Individuals with Disabilities Education Act.  He has been an expert witness on disability policy before Congressional and state (NC and KS) legislative committees.  Together with his wife Ann, he created The Beach Center on Disability at The University of Kansas, a graduate research and training center on families and disability. He also served as chairman of the university's Department of Special Education (1980-1983).  He has published over 300 peer-reviewed articles and chapters, and over 36 books (first through current edition). He has been an expert witness on disability policy in Congress and in state legislatures (North Carolina and Kansas).  He has been president, Am. Ass'n. on Intellectual and Developmental Disabilities; chairman, board of trustees of Judge David L. Bazelon Center on Mental Health Law; senior officer of The Arc of U.S.; senior officer of TASH: The Association for Persons with Severe Handicaps; and chair of the Am Bar Ass's committee on disability law.  Together with his wife Ann and alongside of Pres. J.F. Kennedy and his sister Eunice Shriver, he was recognized by a consortium of seven family and professional associations in the field of intellectual/developmental disabilities as one of 36 people who changed the course of history in the 20th Century.  He has taught courses at Johns Hopkins University, University of Illinois, University of North Carolina, and University of Connecticut, and he has consulted and taught in more than 20 countries.  He has received over 40 accommodations from federal, state, and local professional and family service and advocacy organizations for his leadership. He is the father of Jay (1967-2009), a person with intellectual disabilities, autism, and emotional challenges; and of Amy and Kate, both civil rights advocates. The University of Kansas Archives contains his professional correspondence, especially that concerning the services he and his wife created on behalf of their son Jay and on behalf of other families and individuals affected by disabilities.  He was born in New York City, raised in Bronxville, N.Y., graduated from Kent School, Kent, CT. (1955); Johns Hopkins University (B.A., 1959), University of Maryland Law School (editor-in-chief, Maryland Law Review), Ll.B., 1964, and Harvard Law School (Ll.M., 1969).  He served in the U.S. Army (active reserves), 1962-3.

Education
Turnbull graduated from Kent School in 1955. In 1959, he graduated with a Bachelor of Arts degree in political science from Johns Hopkins University. In 1964, he earned his LL.B./J.D. from University of Maryland Law School and in 1969 his LL.M. from Harvard University Law School.

References

External links 
 University of Kansas profile
 Works at Google Scholar

American educators
American disability rights activists
Kent School alumni
Living people
1937 births
Harvard Law School alumni
American male writers
Johns Hopkins University alumni
University of Maryland Francis King Carey School of Law alumni